= Berkeley Media Studies Group =

Berkeley Media Studies Group (BMSG) conducts research on the influence of mass media over public health and social issues. The BMSG works with community groups, journalists, and public health professionals to use "the power of the media" to advance healthy public policy. BMSG's goal is to use their research to support media and policy efforts of public health advocates. It was founded in 1993 in Berkeley, California, by Lawrence Wallack, DrPH, then-professor of public health at the University of California at Berkeley, and Lori Dorfman, DrPH. It is a project of the Public Health Institute of Oakland, California.
